Gailanne M. Cariddi (November 1, 1953 – June 17, 2017) was an American politician as a member of the Massachusetts House of Representatives for the First Berkshire district.  The First Berkshire District consists of nine communities including the cities of Adams, Cheshire, Clarksburg, Florida, Hancock, Lanesborough, New Ashford, North Adams and Williamstown.

Cariddi was born in North Adams, Massachusetts, in 1953. During her tenure in the Massachusetts House of Representatives, she served as the vice-chair of the Joint Committee on Municipalities and Regional Government, and served as a member of the Joint Committee on Environment, Natural Resources and Agriculture and the Joint Committee on Transportation.

She served on the North Adams City Council.

Cariddi died in office on June 17, 2017, at Massachusetts General Hospital in Boston due to cancer.

References

1953 births
2017 deaths
Bentley University alumni
Massachusetts city council members
Democratic Party members of the Massachusetts House of Representatives
People from North Adams, Massachusetts
Women state legislators in Massachusetts
21st-century American politicians
21st-century American women politicians
Women city councillors in Massachusetts